In the geometry of hyperbolic 3-space, the order-4-5 square honeycomb is a regular space-filling tessellation (or honeycomb) with Schläfli symbol {4,4,5}. It has five square tiling {4,4} around each edge. All vertices are ultra-ideal (existing beyond the ideal boundary) with infinitely many square tiling existing around each vertex in an order-5 square tiling vertex arrangement.

Images

Related polytopes and honeycombs 

It a part of a sequence of regular polychora and honeycombs with square tiling cells: {4,4,p}

Order-4-6 square honeycomb

In the geometry of hyperbolic 3-space, the order-4-6 square honeycomb is a regular space-filling tessellation (or honeycomb) with Schläfli symbol {4,4,6}. It has six square tiling, {4,4}, around each edge. All vertices are ultra-ideal (existing beyond the ideal boundary) with infinitely many square tiling existing around each vertex in an order-6 square tiling vertex arrangement.

It has a second construction as a uniform honeycomb, Schläfli symbol {4,(4,3,4)}, Coxeter diagram, with alternating types or colors of square tiling cells. In Coxeter notation the half symmetry is [4,4,6,1+] = [4,((4,3,4))].

Order-4-infinite square honeycomb

In the geometry of hyperbolic 3-space, the order-4-infinite square honeycomb is a regular space-filling tessellation (or honeycomb) with Schläfli symbol {4,4,∞}. It has infinitely many square tiling, {4,4}, around each edge. All vertices are ultra-ideal (existing beyond the ideal boundary) with infinitely many square tiling existing around each vertex in an infinite-order square tiling vertex arrangement.

It has a second construction as a uniform honeycomb, Schläfli symbol {4,(4,∞,4)}, Coxeter diagram,  = , with alternating types or colors of square tiling cells. In Coxeter notation the half symmetry is [4,4,∞,1+] = [4,((4,∞,4))].

See also 
 Convex uniform honeycombs in hyperbolic space
 List of regular polytopes

References 

Coxeter, Regular Polytopes, 3rd. ed., Dover Publications, 1973. . (Tables I and II: Regular polytopes and honeycombs, pp. 294–296)
 The Beauty of Geometry: Twelve Essays (1999), Dover Publications,  (Chapter 10, Regular Honeycombs in Hyperbolic Space) Table III
 Jeffrey R. Weeks The Shape of Space, 2nd edition  (Chapters 16–17: Geometries on Three-manifolds I,II)
 George Maxwell, Sphere Packings and Hyperbolic Reflection Groups, JOURNAL OF ALGEBRA 79,78-97 (1982) 
 Hao Chen, Jean-Philippe Labbé, Lorentzian Coxeter groups and Boyd-Maxwell ball packings, (2013)
 Visualizing Hyperbolic Honeycombs arXiv:1511.02851 Roice Nelson, Henry Segerman (2015)

External links 
John Baez, Visual insights: {7,3,3} Honeycomb (2014/08/01) {7,3,3} Honeycomb Meets Plane at Infinity (2014/08/14) 
 Danny Calegari, Kleinian, a tool for visualizing Kleinian groups, Geometry and the Imagination 4 March 2014. 

Honeycombs (geometry)
Isogonal 3-honeycombs
Isochoric 3-honeycombs
Order-4-n 3-honeycombs
Order-n-5 3-honeycombs
Regular 3-honeycombs